Oropouche fever is a tropical viral infection transmitted by biting midges and mosquitoes from the blood of sloths to humans. This disease is named after the region where it was first discovered and isolated at the Trinidad Regional Virus Laboratory in 1955 by the Oropouche River in Trinidad and Tobago. Oropouche fever is caused by a specific arbovirus, the Oropouche virus (OROV), of the Bunyaviridae family.

Large epidemics are common and very swift, one of the earliest largest having occurred at the city of Belém, in the Brazilian Amazon state of Pará, with 11,000 recorded cases.  In the Brazilian Amazon, oropouche is the second most frequent viral disease, after dengue fever. Several epidemics have generated more than 263,000 cases, of which 130,000 alone occurred in the period from 1978 to 1980. Presently, in Brazil alone it is estimated that more than half a million cases have occurred. Nevertheless, clinics in Brazil may not have adequate testing reliability as they rely on symptoms rather than PCR viral sequencing, which is expensive and time consuming, in many cases there may be co-infection with other similar mosquito-borne viruses.

Symptoms and signs 
Oropouche fever is characterized as an acute febrile illness, meaning that it begins with a sudden onset of a fever followed by severe clinical symptoms. It typically takes 4 to 8 days from the incubation period to first start noticing signs of infection, beginning from the bite of the infected mosquito or midge.

Fevers are the most common symptom with temperatures as high as 104F. Clinical symptoms include chills, headache, myalgia, arthralgia, dizziness, photophobia, vomiting, joint pains, epigastric pain, and rashes.

There also have been some cases where rashes resembles rubella and patients presented systematic symptoms including nausea, vomiting, diarrhea, conjunctive congestion, epigastric pain, and retro-orbitial pain.

The initial febrile episode typically passes after a few days, but it is very common to have a reoccurrence of these symptoms with a lesser intensity. Studies have shown this typically happens in about 60% of cases.

Cause 

The oropouche virus is an emerging infectious agent that causes the illness oropouche fever. This virus is an arbovirus and is transmitted among sloths, marsupials, primates, and birds through the mosquitoes Aedes serratus and Culex quinquefaciatus. The oropouche virus has evolved to an urban cycle infecting humans though midges as its main transporting vector.

OROV was first described in Trinidad in 1955 when the prototype strain was isolated from the blood of a febrile human patient and from Coquillettidia venezuelensis mosquitoes.  In Brazil, OROV was first described in 1960 when it was isolated from a three-toed sloth (Bradypus tridactylus) and Ochlerotatus serratus mosquitoes captured nearby during the construction of the Belém-Brasilia Highway. The oropouche virus is responsible for causing massive, explosive outbreaks in Latin American countries, making oropouche fever the second most common arboviral infection seen in Brazil. So far the only reported cases of Oropouche fever have been in Brazil, Panama, Peru, and Trinidad and Tobago.

ORO fever occurs mainly during the rainy seasons because there is an increase in breeding sites in the vector populations. There has also been reports of the oropouche epidemics during the dry season but this is most likely due to the high population density of mosquitoes from the past rainy season. Moreover, during the dry season there is a deceased chance of outbreaks which decreases the amount of midges this is because the amount of outbreaks is related to the number of human population that has not yet been exposed to this virus.

Mechanism 
Oropouche fever is caused by the oropouche virus (OROV) that belongs to the Peribunyaviridae family of arboviruses. This virus is a single-stranded, negative sense RNA virus which is the cause of this disease. There are no specific ultrastructural studies of the oropouche virus in human tissues that have been recorded to this date. It is likely that this viral agent shares similar morphological characteristics with other members of the Orthobunyavirus genus. Members of the Orthobunyavirus genus have a three part, single-stranded, negative sense RNA genome of small (S), medium (M) and large (L) RNA segments. These segments function to encode nucleocapsids, glycoproteins and the RNA polymerase in that sequential order. Through phylogenetic analysis of nucleocapsid genes in different oropouche virus strains, it has been revealed that there are three unique genotypes (I, II, III) that are currently spreading through Central and South America.

Genomic Reassortment 
Genetic reassortment is said to be one of the most important mechanisms in explaining the viral biodiversity in orthobunyaviruses. This occurs when two genetically related viruses infect the same cell at the same time forming a progeny virus and this virus holds various components of genetic L, M and S segments from the two parental viruses. In reassortment, the S and L segments are the ones that are usually exchanged between species further, the S segment, that is coded by the nucleocapsid protein, and the L polymerase function together to create a replication of the viral genome. Due to this, one segment will restrict the molecular evolution of another segment and this is said to be inherited as a pair. On the contrary, the M segment codes for viral glycoproteins and these could be more prone to mutations due to a higher selective pressure in their coding region because these proteins are major host range determinants.

Pathogenesis 
There is not a significant amount of information about regarding the natural pathogenesis of OROV infections because there have been no recorded fatalities to date. It is known that within 2–4 days from the initial onset of systematic symptoms in humans, the presence of this virus is detected in the blood. In some cases this virus has also been recovered from the cerebrospinal fluid, but the route of invasion to the central nervous system remains unclear. To further understand the pathogenesis of how this virus manifests in the body experimental studies using murine models have been performed.

Murine Models 
BALB/c neonate mice were treated with this virus subcutaneously and presented clinical symptoms five days after inoculation. The mice revealed a high concentration of the replicating virus in the brain along with inflammation of the meninges and apoptosis of neurons without encephalitis, which is inflammation of the brain due to an infection. These findings confirmed the neurotropism of this virus, which means that this virus is capable of infecting nerve cells. Immunohistochemistry was used to reveal how this virus had access to the central nervous system. The findings indicated that the OROV infection starts from the posterior parts of the brain and progresses toward the forebrain. The oropouche virus spreads through the neural routes during early stages of the infection, reaching the spinal cord and traveling upward to the brain through brainstem with little inflammation. As the infection progresses, the virus crosses the blood-brain barrier and spreads to the brain parenchyma leading to severe manifestations of encephalitis. Damage to the brain parenchyma can result in the loss of cognitive ability or death.

Diagnosis 
Diagnosis of the oropouche infection is done through classic and molecular virology techniques. These include:
 Virus isolation attempt in new born mice and cell culture (Vero Cells)
 Serological assay methods, such as HI (hemagglutination inhibition), NT (neutralization test), and CF (complement fixation test) tests and in-house-enzyme linked immunosorbent assay for total immunoglobulin, IgM, and IgG detection using convalescent sera (this obtained from recovered patients and is rich in antibodies against the infectious agent)
 Reverse transcription polymerase chain reaction (RT-PCR) and real time RT-PCR for genome detection in acute samples (sera, blood, and viscera of infected animals)
Clinical diagnosis of oropouche fever is hard to perform due to the nonspecific nature of the disease, in many causes it can be confused with dengue fever or other arbovirus illness.

Prevention 
Prevention strategies include reducing the breeding of midges through source reduction (removal and modification of breeding sites) and reducing contact between midges and people. This can be accomplished by reducing the number of natural and artificial water-filled habitats and encourage the midge larvae to grow.

Oropouche fever is present in epidemics so the chances of one contracting it after being exposed to areas of midgets or mosquitoes is rare.

Treatment 
Oropouche Fever has no cure or specific therapy so treatment is done by relieving the pain of the symptoms through symptomatic treatment. Certain oral analgesic and anti-inflammatory agents can help treat headaches and body pains. In extreme cases of oropouche fever the drug, Ribavirin is recommended to help against the virus. This is called antiviral therapy. Treatments also consist of drinking plenty of fluids to prevent dehydration. Aspirin is not a recommended choice of drug because it can reduce blood clotting and may aggravate the hemorrhagic effects and prolong recovery time.

Prognosis
The infection is usually self-limiting and complications are rare. This illness usually lasts for about a week but in extreme cases can be prolonged. Patients usually recover fully with no long term ill effects. There have been no recorded fatalities resulting from oropouche fever.

Recent Research 
One study has focused on identifying OROV through the use of RNA extraction from reverse transcription-polymerase chain reaction. This study revealed that OROV caused central nervous system infections in three patients. The three patients all had meningoencephalitis and also showed signs of clear lympho-monocytic cellular pattern in CSF, high protein, and normal to slightly decreased glucose levels indicating they had viral infections. Two of the patients already had underlying infections that can effect the CNS and immune system and in particular one of these patients has HIV/AIDS and the third patient has neurocysticercosis. Two patients were infected with OROV developed meningitis and it was theorized that this is due to them being immunocompromised. Through this it was revealed that it's possible that the invasion of the central nervous system by the oropouche virus can be performed by a previous blood-brain barrier damage.

References

External links 

Animal viral diseases
Zoonoses
Tropical diseases